The plains brown tree frog or Victorian frog (Litoria paraewingi) is a species of frog in the subfamily Pelodryadinae. It is endemic to Australia. Its natural habitats are subtropical or tropical dry forests, rivers, freshwater lakes, freshwater marshes, water storage areas, ponds, and canals and ditches.

References

Litoria
Amphibians of New South Wales
Amphibians of Victoria (Australia)
Amphibians described in 1971
Taxonomy articles created by Polbot
Frogs of Australia